An ostectomy is a procedure involving the removal of bone.

Examples include:
 femoral head ostectomy
 Rib removal

In dentistry, ostectomy refers specifically to the removal of bone surrounding a tooth in an attempt to eliminate an adjacent periodontal pocket.

See also 
 List of surgeries by type

References

Orthopedic surgical procedures